Richard Darío Núñez Pereyra (born 16 February 1976 in Montevideo) is a retired Uruguayan footballer.

Career
He started his professional career in Montevideo playing for Danubio, then in 2000 he moved to Europe to the Grasshopper Club Zürich in Switzerland for a club record €4.5 million. There he scored an impressive number of goals and assists.

He moved to Atletico Madrid in Spain in January 2005 as one of the non-EU player and made his debut against Albacete Balompié on 29 January 2005.

Mexico
He has played in Mexico since 13 August 2005, when he joined Cruz Azul, scoring 4 goals against Tecos UAG in his debut match. He later joined C.F. Pachuca. In May 2006, after a successful campaign with Pachuca, he re-signed with Cruz Azul to a 2-year contract.

On 3 January 2008 he has been transferred to Cruz Azul's Rival Club América for US$1,250,000 in 2-year contract worth $700,000 annually. Núñez already wanted to leave Cruz Azul because his future in Cruz Azul depended on what would happen with the transfer of Cesar Delgado.

He played his last game for América in 2008 Copa Libertadores semi-finals first leg. He did not play the second leg due to illness and started his holiday from 4 to 24 June.

Transfer controversy
On 6 June 2008 he was put on the transfer list by Club América. Nuñez was to stay at Club América as a punishment but without playing any tournament or filial teams for not accepting to go to Puebla. However, Nuñez unilaterally terminated his contract and left for Peñarol in September 2008, after FIFA granted the player had rights to sign a new club independently to the contract dispute with América. Also, América sued Nuñez for damages after AWOL (since 25 June) on 13 August directly to FIFA and he counter-sued the club for un-paid wages of August and to resolute the contract as the club allegedly prevented him to train with club through phone conversation. On 5 February 2010, FIFA Dispute Resolution Chamber returned the case to Mexican Football Federation. In July 2010, Núñez reached an agreement with Club América.

Return to Uruguay

Club Titles

References

External links
  
  
 
 

1976 births
Living people
Uruguayan footballers
Uruguay international footballers
Uruguayan expatriate footballers
Danubio F.C. players
Peñarol players
Grasshopper Club Zürich players
Atlético Madrid footballers
Cruz Azul footballers
C.F. Pachuca players
Club América footballers
Rampla Juniors players
Uruguayan Primera División players
Swiss Super League players
La Liga players
Liga MX players
Expatriate footballers in Switzerland
Expatriate footballers in Spain
Expatriate footballers in Mexico
Association football forwards
Footballers from Montevideo